The  is a stable of sumo wrestlers, part of the Dewanoumi ichimon or group of stables. It is an off-shoot of the better known stable of the same name set up by former yokozuna Mienoumi in 1981, which is currently known as Fujishima stable. Former yokozuna Musashimaru branched off from that stable in April 2013 after taking on the elder name of his former head coach and started a new stable using the Musashigawa name. It is located in the same building as the defunct Nakamura stable.

Musashigawa stable is the second stable in sumo history to be founded by a foreign-born former sumo wrestler after Takamiyama's Azumazeki stable. The head coach's nephew, Fiamalu Penitani, was a wrestler at the stable under the shikona of Musashikuni, reaching the makushita division, but he retired in 2019 due to injury problems. The stable was also home to the half Japanese, half African-American wrestler Ichiro Young (Wakaichiro).  Musashigawa stable began with just four wrestlers, but had expanded to 19 by May 2019. In January 2023 the stable had 16 wrestlers.

Owner
2013-present: 15th Musashigawa (iin, the 67th yokozuna Musashimaru)

Notable active wrestlers

None

Coach
None

Referee
Kimura Keitaro (jonidan gyōji, real name Keita Akiba)

Hairdresser
Tokoken (second class tokoyama)

Location and access
Tokyo, Edogawa Ward, Chūō 4-1-10
10 minute walk from Shin-Koiwa Station on Sōbu Line

See also
List of sumo stables
List of active sumo wrestlers
List of past sumo wrestlers
Glossary of sumo terms

References

External links 
Japan Sumo Association profile
homepage for Musashigawa stable

Active sumo stables